The Salonica revolutionary district (Bulgarian: Солунски револуционерен округ, Solunski revolyutsionen okrag) was an organizational grouping of the Bulgarian Macedonian-Adrianople Revolutionary Committees, and its successors, the Secret Macedonian-Adrianople Revolutionary Organization and the Internal Macedonian-Adrianople Revolutionary Organization. The most famous leader of the group was Damyan Gruev. This rebel group was active in Aegean Macedonia and Vardar Macedonia with headquarters in Thessaloniki (historically known as Salonica, Solun in Bulgarian).

Ottoman Thessalonica